Ralph Sylvester Peer (May 22, 1892 – January 19, 1960) was an American talent scout, recording engineer, record producer and music publisher in the 1920s and 1930s. Peer pioneered field recording of music when in June 1923 he took remote recording equipment south to Atlanta, Georgia, to record regional music outside the recording studio in such places as hotel rooms, ballrooms, or empty warehouses.

Career
Peer, born in Independence, Missouri, spent some years working for Columbia Records, in Kansas City, Missouri, until 1920, when he was hired as recording director of General Phonograph's OKeh Records label in New York. In the same year, he supervised the recording of Mamie Smith's "Crazy Blues", the first blues recording specifically aimed at the African-American market. In 1924, he supervised the first commercial recording session in New Orleans, Louisiana, recording jazz, blues, and gospel music groups there.

He is also credited with what is often called the first country music recording, Fiddlin' John Carson's disc "Little Old Log Cabin In The Lane"/"That Old Hen Cackled and The Rooster's Goin' To Crow". In August 1927, while talent hunting in the southern states for the  Victor Talking Machine Company, he recorded both Jimmie Rodgers and the Carter Family in the same session at a makeshift studio in Bristol, Tennessee, known as the Bristol sessions. This momentous event could be described as the genesis of country music as we know it today. Rodgers, who later became known as the Father Of Country Music, cut "The Soldier's Sweetheart" and "Sleep, Baby, Sleep", while the Carters' first sides (August 1, 1927) were: "Bury Me under the Weeping Willow", "Single Girl, Married Girl", "The Poor Orphan Child", and "The Storms Are on the Ocean". Also in 1927, Peer recorded the fathers of modern RnB, The Memphis Jug Band, in a makeshift studio in the heart of Memphis' Beale St. in the McCall Building, as well as a sanctified preacher named Elder J.E. Burch in Atlanta, who would become the inspiration for Dizzy Gillespie to begin playing music. In July 1929, he recorded female country singer Billie Maxwell.

In his autobiography, Nathaniel Shilkret, Manager of the Victor Talking Machine Company's Foreign Department from about 1920 through 1926 and then Director of Light Music until 1933, notes that about a year after he hired Peer, Peer asked for a raise, which Shilkret approved. Shilkret comments on Peer's business acumen in making a very profitable trade for this raise: "[Victor executive] Walter Clark met Peer, who sold Clark an idea. No raise, but a royalty of one cent per record side that he would divide with the artist.... When I heard of this I was stunned. No one on the musical staff had been offered royalty for his arrangements or compositions, and here was a man collecting royalties with other men's compositions!"

Peer went on to publish and record other country and jazz artists and songs through his company Southern Music Publishing Company. Fats Waller, Jelly Roll Morton, Louis Armstrong, and Count Basie were on Southern's roster. Then into popular music with songs such as Hoagy Carmichael and Stuart Gorrell's "Georgia On My Mind".

The company became influential in the 1930s, and success came through Peer's introducing Central American music to the world. In 1940, there was a major development when a dispute between the copyright organization American Society of Composers, Authors and Publishers (ASCAP) and US radio stations led to the inauguration of the rival Broadcast Music Incorporated (BMI). BMI supported music by blues, country and hillbilly artists, and Peer, through his Peer-International company, soon contributed a major part of BMI's catalogue.

During and after World War II Peer published songs such as "Deep In The Heart Of Texas" and "You Are My Sunshine" (sung by Jimmie Davis, covered by Bing Crosby and many others), "Humpty Dumpty Heart" (Glenn Miller), "You're Nobody till Somebody Loves You" (Russ Morgan), "The Three Caballeros" (Andrews Sisters), "Say A Prayer For The Boys Over There" (Deanna Durbin), "I Should Care", and "The Coffee Song" (both Frank Sinatra). In 1945, he published Jean Villard Gilles and Bert Reisfeld's composition "Les trois cloches" ("The Three Bells"), which was recorded by The Browns.

In the 1950s, Peer published "Mockingbird Hill", a million seller for Patti Page, "Sway" (Dean Martin and Bobby Rydell), and the novelty "I Know An Old Lady" (Burl Ives). Then came rock 'n' roll and Southern published hits by Buddy Holly, Little Richard, The Big Bopper, and The Platters. In 1948, Peermusic founded its concert music division, today Peermusic Classical; composers published by Peermusic include Lou Harrison, Jerome Kitzke, Mario Lavista, Tania León, Charles Ives, and Stefan Wolpe.

Starting in the late 1940s, Peer took an avid interest in horticulture, growing and becoming an expert on camellias. He died in Hollywood, California, in 1960. His widow, Monique Iversen Peer, became president of his company, then called the Peer-Southern Organization. Their son, Ralph Peer, II joined the firm in the late 1960s and became CEO in 1980.

Honors
In 1955, Ralph S. Peer was awarded the Veitch Memorial Medal by the Royal Horticultural Society (RHS).

Peer was elected to the Country Music Hall of Fame in 1984.

Legacy 
In 2017, Peer was featured in the award-winning documentary series American Epic. Directed by Bernard MacMahon, the films featured restored audio recordings of Ralph Peer discussing how he found and recorded some of the first country, blues, and RnB musicians in the 1920s.

Further reading
Ralph Peer and the Making of Popular Roots Music, by Barry Mazor (Chicago Review Press) was published in November 2014.

References

Bibliography 
 Wald, Elijah & McGourty, Allison & MacMahon, Bernard. American Epic: The First Time America Heard Itself. New York: Touchstone, 2017. .

External links
 Ralph S. Peer official website
 Ralph Peer biography
 Ralph Peer's account of his work with Jimmie Rodgers
 Peermusic.com the current incarnation of the company started by Ralph S. Peer and now run by Ralph I. Peer II
 [ Allmusic]
 Country Music Hall of Fame and Museum
 Ralph Peer recordings at the Discography of American Historical Recordings.

1892 births
1960 deaths
People from Independence, Missouri
Record producers from Missouri
American audio engineers
Country Music Hall of Fame inductees
20th-century American engineers
Early Recording Engineers (1930-1959)